The 2012 United States Senate election in Hawaii took place on November 6, 2012, concurrently with the 2012 U.S. presidential election, as well as other elections to the United States Senate and House of Representatives and various state and local elections. Incumbent Democratic U.S. Senator Daniel Akaka decided to retire, instead of running for re-election to a fourth full term. Democratic Congresswoman Mazie Hirono defeated former Republican Hawaii Governor Linda Lingle, in a rematch of the 2002 Hawaii gubernatorial election. This was the first open Senate seat in the state of Hawaii since 1976.

Background 
U.S. Representative Daniel Akaka was appointed by Governor John Waihee to the U.S. Senate to serve temporarily after the death of U.S. Senator Spark Matsunaga, and sworn into office on May 16, 1990. On November 6 of the same year, he was elected to complete the remaining four years of Matsunaga's unexpired term. He was re-elected in 1994 for a first full six-year term and again in 2000 and 2006. Despite originally saying he would seek re-election in 2012, on March 2, 2011, Akaka announced that he would not run for re-election.

Democratic primary 
The primary election was held on August 11. After being locked in a tight race with Ed Case, her predecessor in Congress, incumbent Congresswoman Mazie Hirono pulled away in the final vote, handily defeating Case.

Candidates 
 Ed Case, former U.S. Representative
 Michael Gillespie
 Antonio Gimbernat
 Mazie Hirono, U.S. Representative
 Arturo Reyes

Withdrew 
 Daniel Akaka, incumbent U.S. Senator

Declined 
 Tammy Duckworth, Assistant Secretary of Public/Intergovernmental Affairs (ran for Congress in Illinois)
 Colleen Hanabusa, U.S. Representative
 Mufi Hannemann, former Mayor of Honolulu (ran for Congress)

Campaign 
In December 2011, Democratic Senatorial Campaign Committee Chairwoman and U.S. Senator Patty Murray for Washington endorsed Hirono. U.S. Senator and President Pro Tempore Daniel Inouye for Hawaii also endorsed her. Case criticized "D.C. insiders." He also argued that he is a fiscal moderate, while Hirono was rated the 6th most liberal member of the U.S. House. The Daily Kos blog described Ed Case a "Democratic villain."

Polling

Results

Republican primary 
The primary election was held on August 11.

Candidates 
 John Carroll, former State Senator, former State Representative and perennial candidate
 Charles Collins
 Linda Lingle, former Governor
 Eddie Pirkowski, businessman and perennial candidate
 John Roco

Declined 
 Duke Aiona, former lieutenant governor
 Charles Djou, former U.S. representative (running for U.S. House)

Polling

Results

General election

Candidates 
 Mazie Hirono (Democratic), U.S. Representative
 Linda Lingle (Republican), former Governor
 Heath Beasley (Independent)

Debates 
 September 6, 2012 – Honolulu Japanese Chamber of Commerce and various other hosts
 October 8, 2012 – AARP Hawaii
 October 16, 2012 – Honolulu Civil Beat, Complete video of debate at C-SPAN
 October 18, 2012 – PBS Hawaii
 October 22, 2012 – Hawaii Star Advertiser

Fundraising

Top contributors

Top industries

Predictions

Polling 

Democratic primary

with Duke Aiona

with Colleen Hanabusa

with Charles Djou

With Mufi Hannemann

with Brian Schatz

Endorsements

Results

Results by congressional district
Hirono won both congressional districts.

See also 
 2012 United States Senate elections
 2012 United States House of Representatives elections in Hawaii

References

External links 
 Hawaii Office of the Elections
 Campaign contributions at OpenSecrets.org
 Outside spending at the Sunlight Foundation
 Candidate issue positions at On the Issues

Campaign sites (Archived)
 John Carroll for U.S. Senate
 Ed Case for U.S. Senate
 Mazie Hirono for U.S. Senate
 Linda Lingle for U.S. Senate
 Eddie Pirkowski for U.S. Senate

2012
Hawaii
Senate